The 1677 Construction Programme was a group of Royal Navy ships of the line approved on 5 March 1677. This program authorised the construction of thirty new warships for the Royal Navy and was a compromise between the 40 ship programme proposed by Samuel Pepys in 1675 and the Parliamentary counter proposal of twenty ships in 1676. This programme included the construction of one first rate, nine second rates, and twenty third rate naval vessels.

Design and Specifications
The design was to initiate standardisation in the ships to include the mast structures, rigging to stabilise the masts, and the sail plans. Included in this standardisation were the ordnance carried and crew size. The dimensions of the ships were to a standardised formula, though individual shipbuilders were still allowed to tweak the designs of individual ships.

The vessels were to have twenty-six gunports on both the lower and upper decks split evenly at thirteen per deck per side. Three vessels (Lenox, Hampton Court, and Captain) were initially to be completed with only twelve-gunports on the upper deck per side. The initial gun establishment would be for 70 guns in wartime and 62 guns for peacetime consisting of twenty-six demi-cannons (54 cwt, 9.5 ft) on the lower deck, twenty-six 12-pounder guns (32 cwt, 9 ft) on the upper deck, ten sakers (16 cwt, 7 ft) on the quarterdeck and four sakers (16 cwt, 7 ft) on the foc’x’le with four 3-pounder guns (5 cwt, 5 ft) on the poop deck or roundhouse.

As time progressed the established armament of the ships changed. In 1685 the gun armament changed to twenty-two demi-cannons and four culverins on the lower deck with the remaining guns being unchanged, In 1703 the guns were changed again. The Establishment for a 70/62-gun Third Rate was now twenty-four/twenty-two 24-pounder guns on the lower deck, twenty-six/twenty-four 9-pounder guns on the upper deck, Twelve/ten 6-pounder guns on the quarterdeck, four/two 6-pounder guns on the foc’x’le, and four 4-pounder guns on the poop deck or roundhouse. The actual composition of the gun armaments varied and will be specified on the individual ship articles.

The established crew compliment for a Third Rate for sailors (personnel for the working of sails and rigging) would initially be 160 personnel, though it was later reduced to 150 personnel. Each gun would be assigned a specific gun manning: i.e. six men for a demi-cannon (or 32-pounder), culverins (or 18-pounder) would have 5 men, a 12-pounder would have four, sakers would have three men per gun and 5-pounders would have two men per gun. The establishment for a Third Rate was for a crew of 460/380/300 personnel based on the armament carried and whether it was wartime of peacetime conditions and the number of guns carried.

Within this programme many new names would be instituted. Four vessels would be named for the illegitimate sons of the King, Charles II. HMS Lenox would be named for Charles Lennox, created the Duke of Lennox in 1675. HMS Burford would be named for Charles Beauclerk, created the Duke of Burford in 1676. HMS Grafton was named for Henry Fitzroy, created the Duke of Grafton in 1675. HMS Northumberland was named for George Fitzroy, created the Duke of Northumberland in 1678.

Third Rates of the 1677 Programme

Citations

References
 Colledge (2020), Ships of the Royal Navy, by J.J. Colledge, revised and updated by Lt-Cdr Ben Warlow and Steve Bush, published by Seaforth Publishing, Barnsley, Great Britain, © the estate of J.J. Colledge, Ben Warlow and Steve Bush 2020, EPUB 
 Clowes (1898). The Royal Navy, A History from the Earliest Times to the Present. by William Laird Clowes, published by Sampson Low, Marston & Company, London. England, © 1898
 

Ships of the line of the Royal Navy
1670s ships